James A. Westerfield (March 22, 1913 – September 20, 1971) was an American character actor of stage, film, and television.

Early years 
Westerfield was born in Nashville, Tennessee, to candy-maker Brasher Omier Westerfield and his wife Dora Elizabeth Bailey. He was raised in Detroit, Michigan.  (A news story in the June 12, 1949, issue of the Brooklyn Daily Eagle calls the information in the preceding sentence into question. It describes Westerfield as "the son of a famous producer-director" and says he was "a youngster in Denver, Col.")

Stage career 
Westerfield became interested in theatre as a young man and in the 1930s joined Gilmor Brown's famed Pasadena Community Playhouse, appearing in dozens of plays.  He played in numerous films following his screen debut in 1940, then went to New York City and performed on Broadway, winning two New York Drama Critics' Circle Awards for his supporting roles in The Madwoman of Chaillot and Detective Story. He then returned to Hollywood and was cast in more than 40 additional films. 

Despite his growing involvement acting in motion pictures and later in television productions, Westerfield maintained an active interest in the theatre for the remainder of his career. He directed more than 50 musicals in a summer-musical tent he owned in Danbury, Connecticut, and was the original stage director and producer for the Greek Theatre in Los Angeles. He directed three seasons of "Theatre Under the Stars" in Vancouver, British Columbia, and appeared in musical roles with the Detroit Civic Light Opera, the Los Angeles Civic Light Opera, and the San Francisco Civic Light Opera. He also was active in the Gaetano Merola Opera Company in San Francisco in the early 1940s.

Films
On film, Westerfield had roles in The Magnificent Ambersons (1942), On the Waterfront (1954), Lucy Gallant (1955), the 1957 Budd Boetticher-directed Western Decision at Sundown starring Randolph Scott, Cowboy (1958), a repeating role in The Shaggy Dog, The Absent-Minded Professor (1961) and its sequel Son of Flubber (1963), Birdman of Alcatraz (1962), Man's Favorite Sport (1964), The Sons of Katie Elder (1965), Hang 'Em High (1968) and True Grit (1969).

Television
Westerfield had many roles on television, including seven episodes as John Murrel from 1963 to 1964 on ABC's The Travels of Jaimie McPheeters, starring child actor Kurt Russell in the title role. He made two guest appearances on Perry Mason, including the role of Sheriff Bert Elmore in the 1957 episode "The Case of the Angry Mourner", as well as in the role of murder victim Roger Quigley in the 1961 episode "The Case of the Resolute Reformer".  He also appears in the 1954 episode "Texas Draw" on the Western The Lone Ranger.

Some other examples of Westerfield's work on television include performances on series such as The Rifleman, The Californians, Richard Diamond, Private Detective, The Alaskans, The Rebel, Straightaway, Going My Way, The Asphalt Jungle, Hazel, The Twilight Zone, The Andy Griffith Show, Daniel Boone, The Beverly Hillbillies, two episodes of Maverick, and four episodes of Gunsmoke. He played the circus leader, Dr. Marvello, in an episode of Lost in Space "Space Circus" (1966), My Three Sons  "A horse for Uncle Charlie" (1968).

Personal life 
Westerfield as a young man was a roommate of fellow Pasadena Playhouse actor George Reeves.  The two remained close friends until Reeves's death in 1959. 

In the 1950s, Westerfield's wife was the former Frances Lansing, who had been an actress. Later, Westerfield was married to Alice G. Fay (an actress under the name Fay Tracey). 

Westerfield died from a heart attack in Woodlands Hills, California, at the age of 58.

Selected filmography

 The Howards of Virginia (1940) - Backwoodsman (film debut, uncredited)
 Highway West (1941) - Swede - Trucker at Cafe
 The Bashful Bachelor (1942) - Carnival Pitchman (uncredited)
 About Face (1942) - Soldier with Daisy (uncredited)
 The Magnificent Ambersons (1942) - Policeman at Accident (uncredited)
 The Pride of the Yankees (1942) - Spectator (uncredited)
 Timber (1942) - Lumberjack (uncredited)
 Around the World (1943) - Bashful Marine (uncredited)
 Since You Went Away (1944) - Convalescent on Rehab Steps (uncredited)
 O.S.S. (1946) - Det. Roberts (uncredited)
 Undercurrent (1946) - Henry Gilson
 The Chase (1946) - Job the Butler
 Side Street (1950) - Patrolman Charlie (uncredited)
 Ma and Pa Kettle Go to Town (1950) - Harvey - Zoo Attendant (uncredited)
 The Whistle at Eaton Falls (1951) - Joe London
 On The Waterfront (1954) - Big Mac
 Three Hours to Kill (1954) - Sam Minor
 The Human Jungle (1954) - Police Capt. Marty Harrison
 The Violent Men (1954) - Sheriff Magruder
 Chief Crazy Horse (1955) - Caleb Mantz
 Cell 2455, Death Row (1955) - Red (uncredited)
 The Cobweb (1955) - James Petlee
 The Scarlet Coat (1955) - Col. Jameson
 Lucy Gallant (1955) - Harry Wilson
 Man with the Gun (1955) - Mr. Zender
 Away All Boats (1956) - 'Boats' Torgeson
 Three Brave Men (1956) - Chief of Police Timothy Aloysius O'Reilly
 Jungle Heat (1957) - Harvey Mathews
 Decision at Sundown (1957) - Otis
 Cowboy (1958) - Mike Adams
 The Proud Rebel (1958) - Birm Bates
 The Walter Winchell File "The Window" (1958) - Joe Vivianno
 The Hangman (1959) - Herb Loftus
 The Shaggy Dog (1959) - Officer Hanson
 The Gunfight at Dodge City (1959) - Rev. Howard
 Wild River (1960) - Cal Garth
 The Plunderers (1960) - Mike Baron - Saloon Owner
 Bonanza (1960-1970, two episodes) - Sheriff John Logan / Arthur Blackwell
 The Absent-Minded Professor (1961) - Police Officer Hanson
 Homicidal (1961) - Alfred S. Adrims
 Birdman of Alcatraz (1962) - Jess Younger
 Son of Flubber (1963) - Police Officer Hanson
 Man's Favorite Sport (1964) - Policeman
 Bikini Beach (1964) - Cop #2
 The Sons of Katie Elder (1965) - Mr. Vennar
 That Funny Feeling (1965) - Officer Brokaw
 Lost in Space (1966) - Dr. Marvello
 Dead Heat on a Merry-Go-Round (1966) - Jack Balter
 A Man Called Gannon (1968) - Amos
 Blue (1968) - Abe Parker
 Hang 'Em High (1968) - Prisoner
 Smith! (1969) - Sheriff
 True Grit (1969) - Judge Parker
 The Love God? (1969) - Rev. Wilkerson
 Dead Aim (1971) - John Applebee (final film)

References

External links 

 

American male stage actors
American male film actors
American male television actors
People from Nashville, Tennessee
Male actors from Nashville, Tennessee
1913 births
1971 deaths
20th-century American male actors
Male actors from New York City
Male actors from Los Angeles
Western (genre) television actors